RDL may stand for:

Raheja Developers Limited, an Indian real estate development company
Rally for Democracy and Liberty, a Chadian rebel group
Redistribution layer, in an integrated circuit
Régie du logement du Québec, former name of the Tribunal administratif du logement, an agency of the Government of Quebec, Canada
2020 Remote Darts League 1
Report Definition Language, a computer standard
Revolta do Leste, an Angolan nationalist organization
Robust Details Limited, a sound insulation testing company